Government in medieval monarchies generally comprised the king's companions, later becoming the Royal Household, from which the officers of state arose, initially having household and government duties. Later some of these officers became two: one serving state and one serving household. They were superseded by new officers, or were absorbed by existing officers. Many of the officers became hereditary and thus removed from practical operation of either the state or the household.

Especially in the Norman kingdoms these offices will have common characteristics. In the United Kingdom, the Great Officers of State are traditional ministers of The Crown who either inherit their positions or are appointed to exercise certain largely ceremonial functions or to operate as members of the government. Separate Great Officers of State exist for England and for Scotland, as well as formerly for Ireland. It was the same in the Kingdoms of Sicily and Naples. Many of the Great Officers became largely ceremonial because historically they were so influential that their powers had to be resumed by The Crown or dissipated.

England

France

Holy Roman Empire

Princes elector held a "High Office of the Empire" analogous to a modern Cabinet office and were members of the ceremonial Imperial Household. The three spiritual electors were Arch-Chancellors: the Archbishop of Mainz was Arch-Chancellor of Germany, the Archbishop of Cologne was Arch-Chancellor of Italy, and the Archbishop of Trier was Arch-Chancellor of Burgundy. The six remaining were secular electors, who were granted augmentations to their arms reflecting their position in the Household. These augments were displayed either as an inset badge, as in the case of the Arch Steward, Treasurer, and Chamberlain—or dexter, as in the case of the Arch Marshal and Arch Bannerbearer. Or, as in the case of the Arch Cupbearer, the augment was integrated into the escutcheon, held in the royal Bohemian lion's right paw.

Hungary

In the Kingdom of Hungary the Great Officers of State were non-hereditary court officials originally appointed by the king, later some of them were elected by the Diet. They were also called the barons of the kingdom and lords banneret because they were obliged to lead their own Banderium (military unit) under their own banner in times of war. The offices gradually got separated from the role they originally fulfilled and their deputies took over the responsibilities.

Ireland

Naples

During the Vespers War, the Angevins were expelled from the island of Sicily but remained to reign in the continental territories of the kingdom thus forming the so-called kingdom of Naples, but also claiming the throne of Sicily; this explains why the official name of the kingdom of Naples was the kingdom of Sicily. When the Angevins kings settled in Naples they recreated the seven offices of the kingdom

Poland

The following dignitaries were permanent members of the Council in the Crown of the Kingdom of Poland:

Scotland

Sicily

History
In the Kingdom of Sicily, which existed from 1130 to 1816, the Great Officers were officials of the Crown who inherited an office or were appointed to perform some mainly ceremonial functions or to act as members of the government. In particular, it was a norman king, Roger II, who once he became King of Sicily and conquered the territories of Southern Italy was concerned with organizing the Kingdom politically. For this reason, in 1140 King Roger convened a Parliament in Palermo where the seven most important offices of the Kingdom of Sicily were established, to which the title of archons was given.

The system has notable similarities with the English one, being both derived from Norman rulers, in which four of them had a certain correspondence with the officers of the court of the Franks, where there was a senescalk, a marchäl, a kämmerer, a kanzlèr; later reverted with the Great Officers of the Kingdom of France.

With the pragmatic of November 6, 1569 on the reforms of the Courts, three Great Offices of the Kingdom are made the prerogative of the judiciary: the Great Chancellor by President of the Tribunal of the Sacred Royal Conscience; the Great Justiciar, whose functions had already been absorbed by President of the Tribunal of the Royal grand Court; and the Great Chamberlain by the President of the Tribunal of Royal Patrimony.

Officers of State
The Great Officers of State of the former Kingdom of Sicily, consisting of Sicily and Malta, were:

Sweden

Notes

See also
Great Offices of State
Royal Households of the United Kingdom
Kingdom of England
Great Officers of the Crown of France
Kingdom of France
Holy Roman Empire
Great Officers of State of Ireland
Kingdom of Ireland
Kingdom of Poland
Kingdom of Scotland
Kingdom of Sicily
Great Officers of Sweden
Kingdom of Sweden

References

 
Court titles
Ceremonial occupations